The Philippines participated in the 1978 Asian Games held in Bangkok, Thailand from December 9 to December 20, 1978. Ranked ninth with four gold medals, four silver medals and six bronze medals with a total of 14 medals.

Asian Games performance
Bowling was played for the first time, and the women's team led by Bong Coo won three of the country's total output of four gold medals. Bong Coo of bowling was the most successful Filipino campaigner. She won the masters, where she set a 15-game finals record with a 210 average, semi finals and grand finals records; in the singles event she set the Asian Games record and was a member of the champion team of five with Rosario de Leon, Lolita Reformado, Lita de la Rosa, and Nellie Castillo. Bong Coo also topped the individual all events where she set an Asian Games record.

The other gold medalist was Ral Rosario, who ruled the 200-meter freestyle in a national record of 1:56.68

Medalists

The following Philippine competitors won medals at the Games.

Gold

Silver

Bronze

Multiple

Medal summary

Medal by sports

References

Nations at the 1978 Asian Games
1978
Asian Games